Yori may refer to:
Yori (kana), in Japanese writing
Yori, Tajikistan, a village in Tajikistan
 Connie Yori (born 1963), American basketball coach
Yori (Kim Possible), a fictional character in the 2002–2007 animated series Kim Possible
 Yori, a character from the 1982 film Tron
Kubing, a Philippine musical instrument